Munzir ibn Sawa was the governor of the Persian Sasanian Empire of historical Bahrain, the eastern coast of the Arabian peninsula opposite of Tihamah.

Munzir was a prominent Arab chief and Tabi'un in the 7th century who hailed from the Banu Tamim tribe. his genealogical full name is Munzir bin Sawî bin al-Akhnas bin Bayān bin Amr bin Abdullah bin Zaid bin Abdullah bin Darim bin Malik bin Hanzalah bin Malik bin Zaid bin Manat Al-Tamimi. He was known as Persian governor of archaic Bahrain lands which included modern time Bahrain, Eastern part of Saudi Arabia, Kuwait, South Iraq, Qatar, United Arab Emirates, and Oman during the age of the Islamic prophet Muhammad. In the 7th century, when Muhammad started preaching Islam throughout the world, the message of Islam was sent by Muhammad to Munzir ibn Sawa Al-Tamimi.

Before Islam, the inhabitants of Bahrain (Eastern part of the Arabian Peninsula) were idol worshippers, worshipping gods such as Awal. Nestorian Christianity was also practiced in the region. Islam swept the entire Arabian region in the 7th century, overturning the idol worshippers and Christians. Muhammad sent his first envoy Al-Ala'a Al-Hadrami to Munzir ibn Sawa Al-Tamimi, the ruler of Bahrain, which in those days, extended the coast from Basrah in Iraq to the south of Qatar, including al-Hasa, Kuwait, Bahrain, the UAE & Oman, in the year 628, inviting him to Islam. Munzir, responding to Muhammad's call announced his conversion to Islam and all the Arab inhabitants of historical Bahrain became Muslim, heralding the beginning of the Islamic era in Bahrain. Consequently, Al-Ala'a Al-Hadrami was appointed by Muhammad as his representative in Bahrain to collect the Zakah (religious tax).

Letter of Muhammad

During the Expedition of Zaid ibn Haritha (Hisma) Muhammad sent Al-Ala'a Al-Hadrami to Munzer bin Sawa the king of Bahrain called Munzir ibn Sawa Al-Tamimi. The letter from Muhammad is preserved and can be seen at Beit Al Qur'an museum in Hoora, Bahrain, with the seal of Muhammad still intact, though some have claimed it's a forged replica.

See also
 Khamis Mosque
 Islam
 Bahrain
 Qatar
 Muqawqis
 Non-Muslims Interactants with Muslims During Muhammad's Era
 List of battles of Muhammad

Further reading
 al-Mubarakpuri, Saif-ur-Rahman (2002). al-Raheeq al-Makhtoom, "The Sealed Nectar". Islamic University of Medina. Riyadh: Darussalam publishers. .

References

History of Eastern Arabia
Governors of the Sasanian Empire
Converts to Islam
Arabs from the Sasanian Empire
7th-century Arabs